Antonios Asimakopoulos (alternate spelling: Antonis) (Greek: Αντώνης Ασημακόπουλος; born July 24, 1976) is a Greek professional basketball player. He is a 2.04 m (6 ft 8  in) tall power forward.

Professional career
In his professional career, Asimakopoulos has played in the top Greek League with: Near East, Panellinios, Ionikos N.F., Aris, Olympias Patras, and Kolossos Rodou. In 2012, he returned to play with his former club Aris, after spending 5 seasons with Kolossos. In 2014, he signed with Ippokratis Kos.

National team career
Asimakopoulos played with Greece's under-26 selection at the 2001 Mediterranean Games, where he won a silver medal.

References

External links
EuroCup Profile
FIBA Profile
Eurobasket.com Profile
Greek Basket League Profile 
Hellenic Federation Profile 
Draftexpress.com Profile

1976 births
Living people
Aris B.C. players
Competitors at the 2001 Mediterranean Games
Dafnis B.C. players
Greek men's basketball players
Ionikos N.F. B.C. players
Kolossos Rodou B.C. players
Mediterranean Games medalists in basketball
Mediterranean Games silver medalists for Greece
Near East B.C. players
Olympias Patras B.C. players
Panellinios B.C. players
Panionios B.C. players
Papagou B.C. players
Power forwards (basketball)
Small forwards
Basketball players from Athens